Ronald Cook (23 September 1917 – 1998) was an English professional footballer who played in the Football League for Mansfield Town.

References

1917 births
1998 deaths
English footballers
Association football forwards
English Football League players
Ripley Town F.C. players
Mansfield Town F.C. players